Armed Forces for a Federal Republic (FARF) were a rebel group in Chad in the 1990s.

References

Paramilitary organisations based in Chad